This list of national newspapers is a list of national newspapers as described at newspaper types.

In particular, this list considers a newspaper to be a national newspaper if the newspaper circulates throughout the whole country (as contrasted with a local newspaper serving a city or region).  National newspapers on this list also include metropolitan newspapers with expanded distribution networks.

Albania

 Agon
 Gazeta Shqip
 Gazeta Shqiptare
 Koha Jonë
 Mapo
 Metropol
 Panorama
 Rilindja Demokratike
 Shekulli
 Sot
 Sporti shqiptar
 Telegrafi
 Tema
 Zëri i Popullit

Australia

 The Australian
 The Australian Financial Review

Canada

France

 La Croix
 Les Échos
 L'Équipe
 Le Figaro
 L'Humanité
 Libération
 Le Monde
 Le Parisien/Aujourd'hui en France
 La Tribune

Germany

 Sueddeutsche Zeitung
 Frankfurter Allgemeine Zeitung
 Die Welt
 Handelsblatt
 Die Tageszeitung
 Bild, Boulevard/Tabloid style
 Die Zeit, published weekly

Greece

Haiti

 Balistrad
 Le Nouvelliste
 Le Matin

India

 The Hindu
 The Times of India
 Hindustan Times
 The Telegraph
 Nav Diwas
 Dainik Jagran
 Hindustan

Ireland

Business Post
Irish Independent
Irish Times

Japan

 Asahi Shimbun
 Mainichi Shimbun
 Nihon Keizai Shimbun
 Sankei Shimbun
 Yomiuri Shimbun

Mexico

 El Universal
 Reforma
 La Jornada
 Milenio
 Excélsior
 El Economista
 La Prensa
 El Heraldo de México

Nepal 

 Gorkhapatra
 Kantipur
 Nepali Times
 Kathmandu Post
 Nagarik
 The Himalayan Times
 The Rising Nepal
 The Annapurna Express

Netherlands

Pakistan

 Daily Pakistan
 Dawn
 The Express Tribune
 The News International
 Pakistan Observer

Philippines

 Manila Bulletin
 Manila Standard
 The Manila Times
 Philippine Daily Inquirer
 The Philippine Star

Poland

 Dziennik Polska-Europa-Świat
 Fakt
 Gazeta Wyborcza
 Przegląd Sportowy
 Puls Biznesu
 Rzeczpospolita
 Super Express
 Trybuna

Portugal

Serbia

 Delo
 Glas Srpske
 Nova Makedonija
 Oslobođenje
 Pobjeda
 Politika
 Vecernje novosti
 Vjesnik

Singapore

 The Straits Times

Taiwan

 Apple Daily
 Focus Taiwan (multi-languages)
 Liberty Times
 Taipei Times (English)
 Taiwan News (English)
 Taiwan Times
 Taiwan Today (multi-languages)

Thailand

 Bangkok Post
 Daily News
 Khao Sod
 Kom Chad Luek
 Matichon
 The Nation
 Thai Post
 Thai Rath

United Kingdom

 Daily Express
 Daily Mail
 Daily Mirror
 The Daily Telegraph
 The Guardian
 The Independent
 London Evening Standard
 Metro
 The Observer
 The Sun
 The Times

United States

 The New York Times
 USA Today
 The Wall Street Journal
 The Washington Post

See also

 Lists of newspapers

National newspapers

Lists of publications